Alley Master is a ten-pin bowling arcade game released in 1988. It was the last game released by Cinematronics.

References

External links

1986 video games
Arcade video games
Arcade-only video games
Bowling video games
Cinematronics games
Video games developed in the United States